Josip Tomašević may refer to:

 Josip Tomašević (footballer, born 1993)
 Josip Tomašević (footballer, born 1994)